Club de Fútbol San Agustín del Guadalix is a Spanish football team based in San Agustín del Guadalix, in the Community of Madrid. Founded in 1987, it plays in Preferente de Madrid – Group 2, holding home matches at Campo de Fútbol San Agustin de Guadalix, with a capacity of 2,000 people.

Season to season

2 seasons in Tercera División

References

External links
 
Soccerway team profile

Football clubs in the Community of Madrid
Association football clubs established in 1987
1987 establishments in Spain